Alar Streimann (born in 1964 in Rakvere) is an Estonian diplomat.

In 1989 he graduated from Tartu University in English language and literature.

Since 1991 he is working at Ministry of Foreign Affairs.

Diplomatic posts
 2015-2019 Ambassador of Estonia in France
 since 2019 Ambassador of Estonia in Germany

In 2001 he was awarded with Order of the White Star, III class.

References

Living people
1964 births
Estonian diplomats
University of Tartu alumni
Ambassadors of Estonia to Germany
Ambassadors of Estonia to France
People from Rakvere